Fortune Brands may refer to:
 Fortune Brands (1969–2011), a defunct holding company
Fortune Brands Home & Security, a manufacturer of home and security products